Anthony Allan Staley  (born 15 May 1939) is an Australian politician. A member of the Liberal Party, he held the Victorian seat of Chisholm from 1970 to 1980 and served as Minister for the Capital Territory (1976–1977) and Minister for Posts and Telecommunications (1977–1980) in the Fraser government. He later served as national president of the Liberal Party from 1993 to 1999.

Early life
Staley was born on 15 May 1939 in Horsham, Victoria. He was educated at Scotch College, Melbourne. He completed the degree of Bachelor of Laws at the University of Melbourne.

Parliament
Staley was elected to parliament at the 1970 Chisholm by-election, which followed the death of the incumbent Liberal MP Wilfrid Kent Hughes. He was the Member for Chisholm from 1970 to 1980 and was Minister for the Capital Territory from February 1976 to December 1977 in the Fraser Government and then Minister for Post and Telecommunications until his retirement from Parliament.

Subsequent activities
He later served as Federal President of the Liberal Party of Australia. In May 1994 when Liberal Leader John Hewson called a leadership spill, Staley as Liberal President caused controversy when he withdrew his support for Hewson. The controversy was due to the expectation that the organisational wing of the party which Staley was in charge of as president did not interfere with the parliamentary party in selecting the leader. In the subsequent leadership spill Hewson was defeated by Alexander Downer but it was expected that Staley would not have survived as party president if Hewson had won the spill.  He did continue on in the position and supported John Howard's bid to become Leader of the Opposition and ultimately Prime Minister.

Personal life
In 1990 he was involved in a serious road accident, which left him needing to use calipers to walk.

References

External links
Great Scot article
Webster World Encyclopedia of Australia
The Staley Family in Australia

1939 births
Living people
Liberal Party of Australia members of the Parliament of Australia
Members of the Australian House of Representatives for Chisholm
Members of the Australian House of Representatives
People educated at Scotch College, Melbourne
20th-century Australian politicians
Officers of the Order of Australia